Seckau is a Marktgemeinde in the state of Styria, Austria. It is situated near Knittelfeld. It is known for the Benedictine Seckau Abbey, once the seat of the bishopric Graz-Seckau.

See also
Diocese of Graz-Seckau

References

Diocese of Seckau, on the Catholic Encyclopædia

Cities and towns in Murtal District
Seckau Tauern